The Custos Rotulorum Act 1545 (37 Hen 8 c 1) was an Act of the Parliament of England.

The whole Act, so far as unrepealed, was repealed by section 8(2) of, and Part II of Schedule 5 to, the Justices of the Peace Act 1968.

Section 2
This section from "that the Archebisshoppe" to "successors and" was repealed by section 1 of, and the Schedule to, the Statute Law Revision Act 1887.

Section 3
This section from "that the Archebisshoppe" to "successors and" was repealed by section 1 of, and the Schedule to, the Statute Law Revision Act 1887.

Section 4
This section from "that the Archebisshoppe" to "successors and" was repealed by section 1 of, and the Schedule to, the Statute Law Revision Act 1887.

This section was repealed by section 1 of, and Schedule 1 to, the Statute Law Revision Act 1948.

References
Halsbury's Statutes,

Acts of the Parliament of England (1485–1603)
1545 in law
1545 in England